Vuk Matić (Serbian Cyrillic: Вук Матић; born May 24, 1978 in Belgrade) is a Serbian bass singer, and soloist of Opera in the National Theatre in Belgrade, Serbia.

He graduated-B.A. and M.A. in solo singing at the Faculty of Music in Belgrade in the class of Professor emerita Radmila Bakočević. At the National Theatre in Belgrade he sang roles in Mozart's The Magic Flute (Papageno), Don Giovanni (Leporello), Donizetti's L'Elisir d'Amore (Dulcamara), Don Pasquale (Don Pasquale), Lucia di Lammermoor (Raimondo), Prokofiev's The Love for Three Oranges (Tchelio), Puccini's La Boheme (Schaunard and Colline), in Serbian operas, Stanislav Binički's Na uranku (At Dawn") (Redzep), Rastislav Kambasković's "Hasanaginica" (Hasanaga), and others.

Vuk Matic is also a guitarist and composer.

References

1978 births
20th-century Serbian male opera singers
Living people
21st-century Serbian male opera singers